Lake George Avenue Historic District is a national historic district located at Ticonderoga, in Essex County, New York. The district contains 20 contributing buildings on 14 properties; 12 houses and eight garages.  It includes single-family homes built between 1919 and 1921 by W.A. Gale for the Ticonderoga Pulp and Paper Company as rental properties for company management.  The houses share a common American Craftsman influenced bungalow style.  Gale also constructed the houses in the Amherst Avenue Historic District.

It was listed on the National Register of Historic Places in 1989.

References

Houses on the National Register of Historic Places in New York (state)
Historic districts on the National Register of Historic Places in New York (state)
National Register of Historic Places in Essex County, New York